Nigel Healey is a British-New Zealand academic in management and higher education, who is Professor of International Higher Education and Vice-President (Global and Community Engagement) at the University of Limerick. He served as Interim Provost and Deputy President during the Covid-19 pandemic from September 2020 to June 2022, returning to his substantive role in July 2022.  His current research interests are in the internationalization of higher education, transnational education and higher education policy and management.

Career
Prior to his appointment at the University of Limerick, Healey held senior academic positions at Fiji National University, Nottingham Trent University, the University of Canterbury and Manchester Metropolitan University, as well as teaching positions at the University of Leicester, Leeds Beckett University and the University of Northampton.

Healey has served as an economic policy advisor to the prime minister of Belarus and the deputy minister of economy of the Russian Federation and managed a number of multinational research and economic development projects in different parts of the world.  His current research interests are in the internationalisation of higher education, transnational education and higher education policy and management.  Earlier in his career, he was the author and/or editor of a number of books on macroeconomic and monetary policy. 

He is chair of the QS Global Advisory Committee which organises international education conferences each year, including QS-APPLE, QS MAPLE, QS Europe, and QS Americas.  He is currently a governor of De Montfort University (Kazakhstan) and a member of the Advisory Board of the European Reform University Alliance.  Healey has previously served terms as a director of the Central Applications Office (CAO) in Ireland, a member of the Council of the Association of Commonwealth Universities (ACU), the Board of Trustees for the UK Council for International Student Affairs (UKCISA) and the Council of the Universities and Colleges Admissions Service (UCAS), a director of the Australia and New Zealand Academy of Management and the Chartered Association of Business Schools and a member of the National Management Committee for the Chartered Management Institute and Universities New Zealand Committee on International Policy.

He is a Fellow of the Chartered Management Institute and the New Zealand Institute of Management and Leadership and a Principal Fellow of the Higher Education Academy.

Education
Healey holds a BA (1st Class Hons.) Economics from the University of Nottingham, an MA (Distinction) Economics from the University of Leeds, an MBA (Distinction) from the University of Warwick, a DBA in Higher Education Management from the University of Bath and a PhD in Management from Nottingham Trent University.

Recent papers and reports
1.	Ilieva, J., Healey, N., Tsiligiris, V.,  Ziguras, C., Killingley, P. and Lawton, W. (2022). The value of transnational education partnerships. British Council.
Healey, N. (2022). What determines the success of an international branch campus? THE Campus, 10 August.
 Covington, R., Healey, N., Jones, A. and Trifiro, F. (2022). Indonesia international branch campus feasibility study and overview of TNE across ASEAN. Foreign Commonwealth and Development Office.
 Healey, N. (2022). The challenges of building a national university in a Pacific Island Country: lessons from the first ten years of Fiji National University. Journal of Higher Education Policy and Management, http://dx.doi.org/10.1080/1360080X.2022.2041255
 Healey, N. (2021). Transnational education: the importance of aligning stakeholders’ motivations with the form of cross-border educational service delivery. Higher Education Quarterly, https://doi.org/10.1111/hequ.12371
 Healey, N. (2019). The end of transnational education?  The view from the UK. Perspectives: Policy and Practice in Higher Education, DOI: https://doi.org/10.1080/13603108.2019.1631227
 Healey, N. (2018). The challenges of managing transnational education partnerships: the views of “home-based” managers vs “in-country” managers, International Journal of Educational Management, 32(2), 241-256.
 Healey, N. (2018). The optimal global integration – local responsiveness trade-off for an international branch campus. Research in Higher Education, 59(5), 623-649.
 Healey, N. (2017). Transnational education and domestic higher education in Asian-Pacific host countries. Pacific-Asian Education, 29, 57-74.
 Healey, N. (2017). Beyond “export education”: aspiring to put students at the heart of a university’s internationalisation strategy. Perspectives: Policy and Practice in Higher Education, 21(4), 119-128.
 Healey, N. (2017). Reflections on the value of insider research as a qualitative research methodology. SAGE Research Methods Cases Part 2, DOI: https://dx.doi.org/10.4135/9781526401489
 Healey, N. (2015), Managing international branch campuses: what do we know?, Higher Education Quarterly, 69(4), 386-409.
 Healey, N. (2015), The challenges of leading an international branch campus: the ‘lived experience’ of in-country senior managers, Journal of Studies in International Education, 20(1), 61–78.
 Healey, N. (2014) When is an international branch campus?, International Higher Education, 78, 22–23
 Healey, N. and Bordogna, C. (2014), From transnational to multinational education: emerging trends in international higher education. Internationalisation of Higher Education, 3, 34–56
 Healey, N. and Michael, L. (2014), Towards a new framework for analysing transnational education, Higher Education Policy, 28(3), 369–391.
 Healey, N. (2014), Towards a risk-based typology for transnational education, Higher Education, 69(1), 1–18.
 Healey, N. (2013), Is UK transnational education “one of Britain’s great growth industries of the future”?, Higher Education Review, 45(3), 6–35
 Healey, N. (2013), Why do English universities really franchise degrees to overseas providers?, Higher Education Quarterly, 67(2), 180–200
 Healey, N. and Gunby, P. (2012), The impact of recent government tertiary education policies on access to higher education in New Zealand, Journal of Education Leadership, Policy and Policy, 27(1), 29–45
 Gunby, P. and Healey, N. (2012), New Zealand, in The impact of economic crisis on higher education, UNESCO, 87–100
 Healey, N. (2011), The 2010 and 2011 Canterbury Earthquakes and organisational learning at the University of Canterbury: does practice make perfect?, Journal of Management and Organization, 17(6), 850–856
 Healey, N. (2008), Is higher education in really internationalising?, Higher Education, 55 (3), 333–355

References

External links 
 Profile on ResearchGate

British economists
New Zealand economists
Living people
Academics of Nottingham Trent University
Year of birth missing (living people)
Principal Fellows of the Higher Education Academy
Fulbright alumni